A Whole Lifetime with Jamie Demetriou is a 2023 comedy special from Jamie Demetriou that was broadcast on Netflix in the United Kingdom from February 28, 2023. A one-hour special, it shows a series of sketches depicting life from cradle to grave, featuring guest appearances and songs.

Synopsis
The hour-long comedy sketch special 
shows a series of comedy sketches taking the audience from the womb, through childhood, adulthood and beyond, accompanied by song.

Production
Demetriou said he was approached by Netflix to pitch sketch comedy ideas. Initially, he said he planned “a more sprawling sketch show and then we figured that an hour is a testing amount of time for something that isn’t narrative.” Demetriou described the show as “birth to death in songs and sketches." The show was commissioned prior to the Covid-19 pandemic and had a delayed production until after the outbreak. The project was produced by BBC Studios Productions and Guilty Party Pictures with Demetriou writing and starring.

Cast
 Jamie Demetriou
 Ellie White
 Emma Sidi
 Katy Wix
 Kiell Smith-Bynoe
 Sian Clifford
 Bella Glanville
 Christopher Jeffers
 Mark Silcox
 Jonny Sweet
 Jon Pointing
 Phoebe Walsh
 Will Hislop
 Al Roberts
 Jonny Sweet
 Raphale Sowole
 Seb Cardinal
 Lloyd Griffith
 Matthew Colthart

Broadcast
The show was available on Netflix from February 28, 2023 in the United Kingdom.

Reception
Stuart Heritage in The Guardian said he “laughed harder and for longer than I can remember”. Isobel Lewis in The Independent said the comedy was “decidedly British but with a Netflix sheen…silly, but lacking the sharpness of Stath or his live sketch characters. It’s that attempt to straddle both worlds that leaves Demetriou’s comedy feeling surprisingly watered down.” Chris Bennion in The Daily Telegraph called it “a wild, ribald sketch comedy special that… shows, in flashes, its creator’s sublime genius, offering moments of sheer joy, punctuated by longer, more baffling sections that ultimately disappoint.”

References

External links

English-language Netflix original programming
2020s British television sketch shows
British surreal comedy television series
Television productions postponed due to the COVID-19 pandemic